The Hague Agreement Concerning the International Deposit of Industrial Designs, also known as the Hague system provides a mechanism for registering an industrial design in several countries by means of a single application, filed in one language, with one set of fees. The system is administered by WIPO.

Instruments
The Hague Agreement consists of several separate treaties, the most important of which are: the Hague Agreement of 1925, the London Act of 2 June 1934, the Hague Act of 28 November 1960 (amended by the Stockholm Act), and the Geneva Act of 2 July 1999.

The original version of the Agreement (the 1925 Hague version) is no longer applied, since all states parties signed up to subsequent instruments. The 1934 London Act formally applied between a London act state that did not sign up to the Hague and/or Geneva Act in relation with other London act states until October 2016. Since 1 January 2010, however, the application of this act had already been frozen.

Countries can become a party to the 1960 (Hague) Act, the 1999 (Geneva) Act, or both. If a country signs up to only one Act, then applicants from that country can only use the Hague system to obtain protection for their designs in other countries which are signed up to the same Act.  For instance, because the European Union has only signed up to the 1999 (Geneva) Act, applicants which qualify to use the Hague system because their domicile is in the European Union can only get protection in countries which have also signed up to the 1999 Act or to both the 1999 and 1960 Acts.

Contracting Parties (member countries)
The Hague System currently has 79 members covering 96 countries.
All contracting parties to one or more of the instruments of the Hague Agreement are members of the Hague Union. A list is shown below:

Notes

A list of the Contracting Parties is maintained by WIPO.

Use of the system

Qualification to use the Hague system
Applicants can qualify to use the Hague system on the basis of any of the following criteria:
 the applicant is a national of a Contracting Party (i.e. member country)
 the applicant is domiciled in a Contracting Party
 the applicant has a real and effective industrial or commercial establishment in a Contracting Party
 the applicant has their habitual residence in a Contracting Party (only available if the Contracting Party in question has adhered to the 1999 (Geneva) Act)

An applicant who does not qualify under one of these headings cannot use the Hague system.  The Contracting Parties include not only individual countries, but also intergovernmental organisations such as the African Intellectual Property Organization (OAPI) and the European Union.  This means an applicant domiciled in an EU member country that is not a Contracting Party, such as Austria or the United Kingdom, can nevertheless use the Hague system on the basis of his or her domicile in the European Union.

Application requirements
An application may be filed in English, French, or Spanish, at the choice of the applicant. The application must contain one or more views of the designs concerned and can include up to 100 different designs provided that the designs are all in the same class of the International Classification of Industrial Designs (Locarno Classification).

The application fee is composed of three types of fees: a basic fee, a publication fee, and a designation fee for each designated Contracting Party.

Examination and registration procedure
The application is examined for formal requirements by the International Bureau of WIPO, which provides the applicant with the opportunity to correct certain irregularities in the application.  Once the formal requirements have been met, it is recorded in the International Register and details are published electronically in the International Designs Bulletin on the WIPO website.

If any designated Contracting Party considers that a design which has been registered for protection in that Contracting Party does not meet its domestic criteria for registrability (e.g. it finds that the design is not novel), it must notify the International Bureau that it refuses the registration for that Contracting Party.  In every Contracting Party that does not issue such a refusal, the international registration takes effect and provides the same protection as if the design(s) had been registered under the domestic law of that Contracting Party.

Duration & renewal
The duration of an international registration is five years, extendable in further five-year periods up to the maximum duration permitted by each Contracting Party. For the 1934 London Act the maximum term was 15 years.

Renewals are handled centrally by the International Bureau.  The applicant pays a renewal fee and notifies the International Bureau of the countries for which the registration is to be renewed.

Naming
The agreement was concluded at the Dutch city The Hague.

References

External links 
 World Intellectual Property Organization (WIPO) information on the Hague Agreement
 List of the Contracting Parties  in the WIPO Lex database — official website of WIPO.

Treaties concluded in 1925
Treaties entered into force in 1928
Intellectual property treaties
Treaties of Albania
Treaties of Armenia
Treaties of Azerbaijan
Treaties of Belgium
Treaties of Belarus
Treaties of Belize
Treaties of the People's Republic of Benin
Treaties of Bosnia and Herzegovina
Treaties of Botswana
Treaties of Bulgaria
Treaties of Ivory Coast
Treaties of Cambodia
Treaties of Canada
Treaties of China
Treaties of Croatia
Treaties of North Korea
Treaties of Denmark
Treaties of the Kingdom of Egypt
Treaties of Estonia
Treaties entered into by the European Union
Treaties of Finland
Treaties of the French Third Republic
Treaties of Gabon
Treaties of Georgia (country)
Treaties of the Weimar Republic
Treaties of Ghana
Treaties of Greece
Treaties of the Hungarian People's Republic
Treaties of Iceland
Treaties of Israel
Treaties of Italy
Treaties of Jamaica
Treaties of Japan
Treaties of Kyrgyzstan
Treaties of Latvia
Treaties of Liechtenstein
Treaties of Lithuania
Treaties of Luxembourg
Treaties of Mali
Treaties of Monaco
Treaties of Mongolia
Treaties of Montenegro
Treaties of Morocco
Treaties of Namibia
Treaties of the Netherlands
Treaties of Niger
Treaties of Norway
Treaties entered into by the African Intellectual Property Organization
Treaties of Oman
Treaties of Poland
Treaties of Mexico
Treaties of Moldova
Treaties of Romania
Treaties of Russia
Treaties of Rwanda
Treaties of Samoa
Treaties of São Tomé and Príncipe
Treaties of Senegal
Treaties of Yugoslavia
Treaties of Singapore
Treaties of Slovenia
Treaties of Spain
Treaties of Suriname
Treaties of Switzerland
Treaties of Syria
Treaties of Tajikistan
Treaties of North Macedonia
Treaties of Tunisia
Treaties of Turkey
Treaties of Turkmenistan
Treaties of Ukraine
Treaties of the United Kingdom
Treaties of the United States
Treaties of Vietnam
Treaties extended to the Dutch East Indies
Treaties extended to Curaçao and Dependencies
Treaties extended to Surinam (Dutch colony)
Treaties extended to the Isle of Man
Treaties extended to Guernsey
Treaties extended to West Berlin
Treaties of East Germany
Treaties extended to the Spanish Protectorate in Morocco
Treaties extended to French Algeria
Treaties extended to Tangier
Treaties extended to Saar (League of Nations)
1925 in the Netherlands
World Intellectual Property Organization treaties